Isabella is a former settlement in Kern County, California. The site was inundated by Lake Isabella. In 1953, the U. S. Corps of Engineers built earthen dams across two forks of the Kern River to create the Isabella reservoir, Kern County's largest body of water year round with a surface area of 11,200 acres.

A post office operated at the original site of Isabella from 1896 to 1953, then at the relocated site from 1953 until the name was changed to Lake Isabella in 1957. The town was founded by Steven Barton in 1893 and named in honor of Queen Isabella of Spain while her name was popular during the 1893 Columbian Exposition.

References

Destroyed towns
Former settlements in Kern County, California
Kern River Valley
Submerged settlements in the United States
1896 establishments in California
1954 disestablishments in California